James and the Giant Peach is a popular children's novel written in 1961 by British author Roald Dahl. The first edition, published by Alfred Knopf, featured illustrations by Nancy Ekholm Burkert. There have been re-illustrated versions of it over the years, done by Michael Simeon (for the first British edition), Emma Chichester Clark, Lane Smith and Quentin Blake. It was adapted into a film of the same name in 1996 (with Smith being a conceptual designer) which was directed by Henry Selick, and a musical in 2010.

The plot centres on a young English orphan boy who enters a gigantic, magical peach, and has a wild and surreal cross-world adventure with seven magically altered garden bugs he meets. Dahl was originally going to write about a giant cherry, but changed it to James and the Giant Peach because a peach is "prettier, bigger and squishier than a cherry." Because of the story's occasional macabre and potentially frightening content, it has become a regular target of censors.

Dahl dedicated the book to his six-year-old daughter Olivia, who died from complications of measles only a year after the book was published.

Plot summary
James Henry Trotter is a boy who lives happily with his parents in a house by the sea. Unfortunately, when he is four years old, an oddly carnivorous rhinoceros escapes from the zoo and eats James' parents. He ends up with his two cruel aunts, Spiker and Sponge. Instead of caring for him, they treat him badly, feed him improperly, and force him to sleep on bare floorboards.

After James has been living with his aunts for three years, he meets a mysterious man who gives him a bag of magical crystals, instructing James to use them in a potion that would change his life for the better. While returning home, James stumbles and spills the bag on the ground, losing the crystals as they dig themselves underground. A nearby peach tree, in turn, produces a single peach which soon grows to the size of a house. Spiker and Sponge build a fence around it and earn money by selling viewing tickets to tourists; James is locked in the house, only able to see the peach through the bars of his bedroom window.

After the tourists have gone, James is assigned to clean the rubbish around the peach and finds a tunnel inside it. He enters it and meets Centipede, Miss Spider, Old Green Grasshopper, Earthworm, Ladybug, Glowworm, and Silkworm who become his friends.

The next day, Centipede cuts the stem of the peach, causing it to roll away and crush James' aunts. It reaches the sea and is surrounded by ravenous sharks. James uses Miss Spider and Silkworm to make threads, while Earthworm is used as bait and draws 502 seagulls to the peach, whereupon the threads are tied on their necks. The peach is lifted off the water. High above the clouds, the peach encounters the Cloud-Men who are portrayed as responsible for weather phenomena like hailstorms and rainbows. Centipede mocks the Cloud-Men, who throw things at the group until they get clear. 

Later, James realizes that the group has reached New York City. The wing of a passing plane severs the strings, and the falling peach lands on the spire of the Empire State Building. It is mistaken for a bomb at first, resulting in the arrival of police and firemen. Calming the crowd, James tells his story, and becomes friends with many children in New York, they eat the peach and James and his friends get their own jobs.

Characters
 James Henry Trotter – The seven-year-old protagonist.
 The Old Man – A friendly yet mysterious man, who initiates James' adventure.
 Aunt Spiker – A thin, tall, cruel and evil woman; Sponge's sister.
 Aunt Sponge – A fat, treacherous, greedy and evil woman; Aunt Spiker's sister.
 The Centipede – A male centipede, depicted as a boisterous rascal and proud of his 'hundred legs', even though he only has 42.
 The Earthworm – A male earthworm who often quarrels with the Centipede.
 The Old Green Grasshopper – A male grasshopper, who is  the eldest and most cultured of the animals.
 The Ladybug – A kind, motherly female ladybird.
 Miss Spider – A good-natured female spider who takes care of James.
 The Glowworm – A female glowworm, who is used as a lighting system for the Peach.
 The Silkworm – A female silkworm, who assists Miss Spider in the production of thread, both before and after the adventure.

Adaptations

Film adaptions

A television adaptation of the novel appeared on BBC One on December 28, 1976. Paul Stone directed a script by Trever Preston. The cast included Simon Bell playing James, Bernard Cribbins playing Centipede, and Anna Quayle playing Aunt Spiker.

Though Roald Dahl declined numerous offers during his life to have a film version of James and the Giant Peach produced, his widow, Felicity Dahl, approved an offer to have a film adaptation produced in conjunction with Disney in the mid-1990s. It was directed by Henry Selick and produced by Denise Di Novi and Tim Burton, all of whom previously made The Nightmare Before Christmas. The movie consists of live action and stop-motion to reduce production finances. It was narrated by Pete Postlethwaite (who also played the old man). The film was released on April 12, 1996. Although it was a box office flop, it received positive reviews and eventually became a cult classic.

There are numerous changes in both the plot of the film and the plot of the book, though the film was generally well received. Felicity Dahl said that, "I think Roald would have been delighted with what they did with James." Owen Gleiberman of Entertainment Weekly praised the animated part, but calling the live-action segments "crude". It was nominated for an Academy Award for Best Original Musical or Comedy Score (by Randy Newman). 

In August 2016, Sam Mendes was in negotiations with Disney to direct another live action adaptation of the novel, with Nick Hornby in talks for the script. In May 2017, Mendes was no longer attached to the project due to his entering talks with Disney about directing a live-action film adaptation of Pinocchio.

Musical adaptation

The book was made into a musical with music and lyrics by Benj Pasek and Justin Paul and book by Timothy Allen McDonald. The musical had its premiere at Goodspeed Musicals on October 21, 2010, and is currently produced in regional and youth theatre.

Theatrical adaptation 
Ray DaSilva's  Norwich Puppet Theatre put on puppet theatre performances in 1985.

Charity readings
In May 2020, in the midst of the COVID-19 pandemic, Taika Waititi, the Oscar-winning director, worked with the Roald Dahl Story Company to publish audio-visual readings of the book. Waititi was joined by Oscar-winning actresses Meryl Streep, Lupita Nyong'o, and Cate Blanchett; actors Benedict Cumberbatch, Liam and Chris Hemsworth, Ryan Reynolds; the Duchess of Cornwall, and others in ten installments which were then published to the Roald Dahl official YouTube channel.

The event was organised to raise money for the global-non profit Partners In Health, founded by Dahl's daughter Ophelia, which had been fighting COVID-19 in vulnerable areas; with Roald Dahl Story Co. committing to match donations up to $1million. Waititi had already been working with the company as the writer, director, and executive producer for Netflix's upcoming serialised adaption of Charlie and the Chocolate Factory.

Editions
 2011 –  (Penguin Classics Deluxe Edition paperback, 50th anniversary, illustrated by Jordan Crane and Nancy Ekholm Burkert, introduction by Aimee Bender)
 2003 –  (audio CD read by Jeremy Irons)
 1996 –  (paperback, illustrated by Lane Smith)
 1995 –  (paperback, illustrated by Quentin Blake)
 1994 –  (paperback)
 1990 –  (paperback, illustrated by Emma Chichester Clark)
 1980 –  (Bantam Skylark paperback)
 1961 –  (hardcover)
 1961 –  (library binding, illustrated by Nancy Ekholm Burkert)

References

External links
 Charity readings of the story by Taika Waititi and celebrities

1961 British novels
1961 children's books
Children's books by Roald Dahl
British novels adapted into films
British fantasy novels
Alfred A. Knopf books
Novels about orphans
British children's novels
Novels by Roald Dahl
Fiction about insects
Novels set in England
Talking animals in fiction
Empire State Building in fiction
Novels set in New York City
Novels set in Manhattan
Self-reflexive novels